Echo sounding or depth sounding is the use of sonar for ranging, normally to determine the depth of water (bathymetry). It involves transmitting acoustic waves into water and recording the time interval between emission and return of a pulse; the resulting time of flight, along with knowledge of the speed of sound in water, allows determining the distance between sonar and target. This information is then typically used for navigation purposes or in order to obtain depths for charting purposes.  

Echo sounding can also be used for ranging to other targets, such as fish schools. Hydroacoustic assessments have traditionally employed mobile surveys from boats to evaluate fish biomass and spatial distributions. Conversely, fixed-location techniques use stationary transducers to monitor passing fish.

The word sounding is used for all types of depth measurements, including those that don't use sound, and is unrelated in origin to the word sound in the sense of noise or tones. Echo sounding is a more rapid method of measuring depth than the previous technique of lowering a sounding line until it touched bottom.

History 

German inventor Alexander Behm was granted German patent No. 282009 for the invention of echo sounding (device for measuring depths of the sea and distances and headings of ships or obstacles by means of reflected sound waves) on 22 July 1913.

One of the first commercial echo sounding units was the Fessenden Fathometer, which used the Fessenden oscillator to generate sound waves. This was first installed by the Submarine Signal Company in 1924 on the M&M liner S.S. Berkshire.

Technique

Distance is measured by multiplying half the time from the signal's outgoing pulse to its return by the speed of sound in the water, which is approximately 1.5 kilometres per second [T÷2×(4700 feet per second or 1.5 kil per second )] For precise applications of echosounding, such as hydrography, the speed of sound must also be measured typically by deploying a sound velocity probe into the water.  Echo sounding is effectively a special purpose application of sonar used to locate the bottom. Since a traditional pre-SI unit of water depth was the fathom, an instrument used for determining water depth is sometimes called a fathometer.

Most charted ocean depths use an average or standard sound speed. Where greater accuracy is required average and even seasonal standards may be applied to ocean regions. For high accuracy depths, usually restricted to special purpose or scientific surveys, a sensor may be lowered to measure the temperature, pressure and salinity. These factors are used to calculate the actual sound speed in the local water column.  This latter technique is regularly used by US Office of Coast Survey for navigational surveys of US coastal waters.

Common use
As well as an aid to navigation (most larger vessels will have at least a simple depth sounder), echo sounding is commonly used for fishing.  Variations in elevation often represent places where fish congregate.  Schools of fish will also register. A fishfinder is an echo sounding device used by both recreational and commercial fishers.

Hydrography
In areas where detailed bathymetry is required, a precise echo sounder may be used for the work of hydrography.  There are many considerations when evaluating such a system, not limited to the vertical accuracy, resolution, acoustic beamwidth of the transmit/receive beam and the acoustic frequency of the transducer. 
 

The majority of hydrographic echosounders are dual frequency, meaning that a low frequency pulse (typically around 24 kHz) can be transmitted at the same time as a high frequency pulse (typically around 200 kHz).  As the two frequencies are discrete, the two return signals do not typically interfere with each other.  There are many advantages of dual frequency echosounding, including the ability to identify a vegetation layer or a layer of soft mud on top of a layer of rock.

Most hydrographic operations use a 200 kHz transducer, which is suitable for inshore work up to 100 metres in depth.  Deeper water requires a lower frequency transducer as the acoustic signal of lower frequencies is less susceptible to attenuation in the water column.  Commonly used frequencies for deep water sounding are 33 kHz and 24 kHz.

The beamwidth of the transducer is also a consideration for the hydrographer, as to obtain the best resolution of the data gathered a narrow beamwidth is preferable.  The higher the operating frequency, the narrower the beamwidth.  Therefore, it is especially important when sounding in deep water, as the resulting footprint of the acoustic pulse can be very large once it reaches a distant sea floor.

A multispectral multibeam echosounder is an extension of a dual frequency vertical beam echosounder in that, as well as measuring two soundings directly below the sonar at two different frequencies; it measures multiple soundings at multiple frequencies, at multiple different grazing angles, and multiple different locations on the seabed. These systems are detailed further in the section called multibeam echosounder.

Echo sounders are used in laboratory applications to monitor sediment transport, scour and erosion processes in scale models (hydraulic models, flumes etc.). These can also be used to create plots of 3D contours.

Standards for hydrographic echo sounding

The required precision and accuracy of the hydrographic echo sounder is defined by the requirements of the International Hydrographic Organization (IHO) for surveys that are to be undertaken to IHO standards.  These values are contained within IHO publication S44.

In order to meet these standards, the surveyor must consider not only the vertical and horizontal accuracy of the echo sounder and transducer, but the survey system as a whole.  A motion sensor may be used, specifically the heave component (in single beam echosounding) to reduce soundings for the motion of the vessel experienced on the water's surface.  Once all of the uncertainties of each sensor are established, the hydrographer will create an uncertainty budget to determine whether the survey system meets the requirements laid down by IHO.

Different hydrographic organisations will have their own set of field procedures and manuals to guide their surveyors to meet the required standards.  Two examples are the US Army Corps of Engineers publication EM110-2-1003, and the NOAA 'Field Procedures Manual'.

Multibeam echosounder

See also
Acoustical oceanography
Alexander Behm – inventor
AUV
Bathymeter
Fessenden oscillator
Fisheries acoustics
Hydroacoustics
Hydrographic survey
Sonar
Depth sounding
Underwater acoustics

References

External links

 "How Echoes Tell Depth of Water Under Ship" Popular Mechanics Monthly, July 1930 – drawing of details of early depth finders using echoes
 ELAC (1982) An Introduction to Echosounding. Honeywell-ELAC-Nautik GmbH, Kiel, 88 pp, (pdf 27.5 MB)

Surveying
Oceanographic instrumentation